Carolina Transfer and Storage Company Building is a historic warehouse building located at Charlotte, Mecklenburg County, North Carolina, United States. It was built in 1927, and is a four-story, flat-slab construction building with brick infill. The building has a flat roof and parapet.

It was added to the National Register of Historic Places in 1999.

References

Commercial buildings on the National Register of Historic Places in North Carolina
Commercial buildings completed in 1927
Buildings and structures in Charlotte, North Carolina
National Register of Historic Places in Mecklenburg County, North Carolina